Payzawat County, also via SASM/GNC romanization as Payziwat County, (also Faizabad and Fayzawat) and via Mandarin Chinese as Jiashi County is a county in Kashgar Prefecture, Xinjiang Uyghur Autonomous Region, China, on the western rim of the Taklamakan Desert. To the east, the county borders Maralbexi County, to the south Yopurga County.

Name

 Payzawat means 'beautiful land of plenty'.

The name of the region is also transliterated as Faizabad.

History
Peyziwat County was established in July 1902.

In 1981, there was a brief pro-independence rebellion, the Jiashi uprising, in the county staged by Uyghur activists after riots in Kashgar.

The 1997 Jiashi earthquakes, continuing to 2003, were a series of deadly earthquakes in the county. Rebiya Kadeer wrote that her career was significantly affected by the earthquakes, which were "one of the worst natural disasters that had occurred in the Uyghur nation in recent memory." One hundred villages and one thousand homes were leveled. Kadeer organized donations and aid for the area. In February 2002, a 6.7 magnitude earthquake killed 267 people in Maralbexi County and Payzawat County.

On August 27, 2008, two ethnic Uyghur police officers were killed.

On October 20, 2014, Shaptul (Xiaputule) was changed from a township to a town.

In 2017, Jiashi County Secondary Vocational School, among the Xinjiang re-education camps, was increased in size, adding new dormitories and factory warehouses; significant security features were added through the introduction of secure 'military-style management'.

On the night of January 19, 2020, a strong earthquake damaged buildings and seriously injured at least one person in the county.

Administrative divisions
Payzawat County includes six towns, seven townships, and one other area:

Towns ( / 镇)
Townships ( / 乡)
Terim Township (Tierimu;  / ), Yengimehelle Township (Yingmaili;  / ), Janbaz Township (Jiangbazi;  / ), Misha Township (Mixia;  / ), Kizilsu Township (Kezilesu, Qizilsu;  / ), Gulluk Township (Guleluke;  / ), Ordeklik Township (Yudaikelike;  / )
Others
Nongsanshijiashizong Farm (农三师伽师总场)

Economy
The system of irrigation is well-developed. Agricultural products include wheat, corn, sorghum, cotton and muskmelon. Animal herding is also common, primarily sheep. Specialities of the county include the 'Payzawat melon' and white grapes without pits. Industries include tractors, electronics, leather making, construction, and cotton and melon processing.

, there was about 55,400 acres (366,889 mu) of cultivated land in Payzawat.

Demographics

As of 2015, 437,073 of the 445,846 residents of the county were Uyghur, 8,342 were Han Chinese, 431 were from other ethnic groups.

, Uyghurs made up 98.9% of the county's population.

As of 1999, 96.46% of the population of Payzawat (Jiashi) County was Uyghur and 3.52% of the population was Han Chinese.

In 1997, Uyghurs made up 97.2% of the county's population.

Climate

Transportation
 G3012 Turpan–Hotan Expressway

Historical maps
Historical English-language maps including Payzawat:

Notes

References

External links

 Map of Payzawat at Google Maps

County-level divisions of Xinjiang
Kashgar Prefecture